
Lissa may refer to:

Places
 the old Venetian name for the Adriatic island of Vis
 the German name for the town of Leszno in Poland
 the German name for the town of Lysá nad Labem in the Czech Republic
 a little town in Germany, in east from Halle (51.4975664N, 12.2737286E)
Kreis Lissa, a Kreis (county) in the southern administrative district of Posen, in the Prussian province of Posen
 Lissa (Lycia), a town of ancient Lycia, now in Turkey

People 
 Lissa, a female given name, e.g., a diminutive form from Melissa or Alyssa.
 Lissa Endriga, American television host and model
 Lissa Evans
 Lissa Hunter, American artist
 Lissa Lauria, American actress and recording artist
 Lissa Martinez, American ocean engineer
 Lissa Muscatine
 Lissa Vera, Argentine singer-songwriter, composer and actress
 Alyssa "Lissa" Daniels of "Lissa Explains it All"
 Zofia Lissa, Polish musicologist

Fictional characters 
 Lissa, a playable character and the younger sister of Chrom from Fire Emblem Awakening.
 Lissa, a main character from the Vampire Academy book series.

Other 
 Sony Lissa
SMS Lissa

See also

de Lissa